Noordschote is a town in Lo-Reninge, a part of Belgium.

External links
Official website Noordschote
Noordschote @ City Review

Populated places in West Flanders